Dhulokona is an Indian Bengali language television series which premiered on Star Jalsha from 19 July 2021 and it is also available on digital platform Disney+ Hotstar. The show is produced under the banner of Magic Moments Motion Pictures.The show starred Manali Dey and Indrasish Roy in lead roles. After a journey of 1 and a half years, Dhulokona ended on 11 December 2022 to give space for Bangla Medium. 

This show marked the comeback of Indrasish Roy after 2 years after his last serial Bajlo Tomar Alor Benu in Star Jalsha and comeback of Manali Dey after a year since her last serial Nokshi Kantha in Zee Bangla, which was also helmed by scriptwriter Leena Gangopadhyay.

Plot 
Phuljhuri, the care-taker of the Ganguly family (who actually is the daughter of the Ganguly family) meets Lalon, the driver of the Ganguly's and a rapper, continuously fight but eventually fall in love with each other. Mini, Debraj and Anandi's mentally unstable daughter starts loving Lalon and Phuljhuri. Chorui becomes jealous and starts making Lalon her own. One day, in Chorui's college function, Chorui and her friends try to intoxicate Lalon, but fails. That night, Chorui returns home with Lalon in an intoxicated condition, and says him 'I Love You Lalon'. Chandreyi files a complaint and the police arrest Lalon and Phuljhuri frees him up. One day, Phuljhuri's parents plan to get Phuljhuri married with Manik, who is twice of Phuljhuri's age. On the day of Phuljhuri's ceremony, Phuljhuri leaves her ceremony to see Lalon as he had an accident. Due to this, Manik refuses to marry Phuljhuri and Bittu says that he will never bring her wife, Priya, who also happens to be Phuljhuri's younger sister. Lalon gets hospitalised and Mini and Debraj report to the Chatterjee's about Lalon's accident. That night, Subal, Arati and Pooja, her youngest sister, kick Phuljhuri out of the house as she breaks her marriage due to Lalon's accident. Elsewhere, Phuljhuri cuts ties with her family. Chorui creates a drama of suicide and Chandreyi supported her. One day, Bittu offers a programme to Lalon and Lalon goes to sing there. Also, Manik stays there. While clicking selfies, a girl puts Lalon into trouble. The girl says that Lalon slapped the girl as she wanted to click a selfie with him. The members say that Lalon harassed that girl. Later, to save Lalon, Phuljhuri was forced to marry Manik.

Then Phuljhuri's family comes. During the wedding, Lalon breaks Phuljhuri's marriage with Manik before putting vermillion on Phuljhuri's forehead. Taan and Kamalini get married, but Chorui gets jealous of Phuljhuri and Mini. On the day of Taan and Kamalini's reception, Lalon and Phuljhuri spend time alone. When Phuljhuri went to say the truth, Chorui slaps Phuljhuri in front of everyone. Chorui wants to forcefully marry Lalon, but the latter wants to marry Phuljhuri in a temple without informing anyone. One day, Anandi, Thammi, Kamalini and Boromamu make a secret pan for Phuljhuri and Lalon's marriage. Phuljhuri lies Chorui by saying she went to Subal and Arati's place. Dolly gets to know about it and reports it to her parents and to Chorui. Chorui stops Lalon and Phuljhuri's marriage and takes Lalon to the police station. Elsewhere, Phuljhuri decides not to ever talk with Lalon, leaving him annoyed. Lalon shows out his anger by insulting Phuljhuri and Chorui brainwashes him. To make Lalon Phuljhuri's, Anandi makes Phuljhuri practice a song. One day, Phuljhuri performs the song shocking Lalon, Chorui. Lalon starts coming closer to Phuljhuri and Phuljhuri is constantly criticised by Chandreyi and Chorui. One day, Subal and Arati come to the Ganguly residence and meet Phuljhuri for taking the money she earned by singing. Phuljhuri learns from Subal she was adopted by Arati and him when they brought up Phuljhuri from the street road and Phuljhuri imagines that who she actually is and gets to know that Priya and Pooja are the only daughters of Subal and Arati biologically. This makes Phuljhuri shattered and Arati emotional. Chorui and her friends plan to kick Phuljhuri out of the Ganguly residence by poisoning Mini. Phuljhuri and Mini go for an outing, where Mini eats a cotton candy and Modon accuses Mini for her mental sickness. Modon gives Phuljhuri a poison, and gives it gi Mini and Mini's stomach pains and her health deteriorates and she was hospitalised. The Ganguly's learn that Mini was poisoned. Anandi slaps Phuljhuri for it and the Ganguly's believe that she did it to break off Lalon  and Chorui's ceremony. She confesses it. Lalon believes that Phuljhuri is not the culprit and tries to gather evidence and to prove that Phuljhuri is not the culprit. Lalon brings Modon and shows the footage and exposes Chorui. Modon gets arrested but Chorui is not taken into custody for some reason. Gablu slaps Chorui for her sins and Chorui plans another conspiracy against Phuljhuri. Phuljhuri drank cold water before her performance, but later, she was warned by Lalon because of the conspiracy. Chorui and her friends planned to drink Phuljhuri and Mrinmayee. Both of them come home in a drunken condition, and Lalon slaps Phuljhuri and says that he'll marry Chorui, in anger. Phuljhuri commits suicide, but gets saved by Lalon. On the day of the ceremony, police officers come and arrest Chorui for her sins and Lalon decides to marry Phuljhuri. One day, Phuljhuri goes to the temple for Lalon's recovery and puts vermillion on Lalon's name. Chorui plans to attack Phuljhuri by putting harmful colour on her eyes on the day of Holi. Slowly, her eyes regain her vision. After 20 – 21 years, Poroma meets Bullet and discusses about the situation when it was time for Poroma's delivery. Years back, Poroma gave birth to Phuljhuri, but as Poroma was unmarried, she regretted to carry Phuljhuri with her. One day, Bullet goes to the hospital where Poroma was admitted during her delivery. Bullet gets to know that one lady of the hospital used to stay in a slum where a wife was unable to give birth to a child and the wife used pray to God and went go to so many places and spent money, but the wife was humiliated by her husband for not giving birth to a child. Bullet gets thrilled to know that Phuljhuri is his daughter. Slowly Phuljhuri gains back her vision. She argues with Raghubir and then goes to Subal and Arati's place to invite them for her marriage. Poroma meets the Ganguly's after years and on the day of their marriage, Subal, Arati, Priya, Pooja and Bittu come. On the wedding day, Dolly secretly brings Chorui and forcefully Lalon marrries Chorui, leaving the Ganguly's shocked.

The show ends on a happy note on Lalon and Phuljhuri returning to India from abroad after a year and their interview and ends where the whole family sings Aguner Poroshmoni of Rabindranath Tagore and a photo of Lalon and Phuljhuri reconciling after returning India.

Cast

Main 
 Manali Dey as Phuljhuri Chatterjee (formerly Ganguly, née Das) aka Rani – Ganguly family's care-taker turned youngest daughter and a singer, Subal and Arati's adopted eldest daughter, Raghubir and Supriya's daughter in-law, Bullet and Poroma's biological daughter, Lalon's wife. (2021 – 2022)
 Indrasish Roy as Lalon Chatterjee aka Lal/Joy– Ganguly family's former driver turned son in-law, and a singer, Phuljhuri's husband, Chorui's ex and unofficial husband, Munni's ex boyfriend and childhood friend, Raghubir and Supriya's son, Bullet and Poroma's son in-law, Subal and Arati's adopted daughter's husband, Dolly's younger brother, Swadesh's brother in-law and Titir's ex-obsessive lover. He loses his memory and partially gains his memory but failed to recognise Phuljhuri and spent moments with Titir. However, on the day of Lalon and Titir's pre-wedding ritual, Rohit pressurises him and finally he gains back his actual memory and is later forgived by Phuljhuri. (2021 – 2022)
 Sweta Mishra as Chorui Talukdar (née Ganguly) – a bharatnatyam dancer, Chandreyi and Gablu's daughter, Lalon's unofficial and ex wife, Sreerupa's daughter in-law, Taan's younger sister, Phuljhuri's elder cousin sister and Rishi's wife. (2021 –2022) (Former Antagonist)

Recurring 
Ganguly Family/Phuljhuri's Family 
 Sabitri Chatterjee as Ratulmoni Ganguly aka Thammi – head of the Ganguly residence, Halua, Gablu and Bullet's mother, Anandi, Chandreyi and Poroma's mother in-law, Mrinmayee, Ganataan, Chorui and Phuljhuri's paternal grandmother, Kabul's maternal grandmother, Lalon, Debmalya, Rishi and Kamalini's paternal grandmother in-law. (2021 – 2022)
 Ratna Ghoshal as Ruprekha Ganguly aka Pisi Thammi – a retired senior school teacher and Phuljhuri's rival. Halua, Gablu and Bullet's paternal aunt. Ratulmoni's sister in-law. An unmarried and selfish lady, who stayed with the Ganguly family. (2021) (Antagonist) 
 Shankar Chakraborty as Debraj Ganguly aka Halua – Anandi's husband and Mrinmayee's father (2021 – 2022)
 Moyna Mukherji as Anandi Ganguly – Halua's wife and Mrinmayee's mother (2021 – 2022)
 Bhaskar Banerjee as Somraj Ganguly aka Gablu – Chandreyi's husband, Taan & Chorui's father, Kamalini and Rishi's father in-law (2021 – 2022)
 Anindita Raychaudhury as Chandreyi Ganguly – a school teacher, Gablu's wife, Taan & Chorui's mother, Kamalini and Rishi's mother in-law, Phuljhuri's arch rival and Lalon's killer (2021 – 2022) (Antagonist) 
 Badshah Moitra as Meghraj Ganguly aka Bullet – Phuljhuri's biological father, Poroma's estranged husband (2021 – 2022)
 Shampa Banerjee as Poroma Ganguly (née Dasgupta) – a college professor, Phuljhuri's estranged and biological mother, Bullet's estranged wife. One night, Bullet puts vermillion on Poroma's forehead and Bullet leaves abroad for his job and she conceives at that time and then a misunderstanding starts as Bullet couldn't return then. 21 years ago she gave birth to Phuljhuri and as she wasn't married legally, she sent her to an orphanage and one lady of the hospital took Phuljhuri to Subal and Arati's slum as Arati was constantly beaten by Subal for not giving birth to a child and in order to not face Arati's sadness. (2022)
 Prity Biswas as Mrinmayee Basu (née Ganguly) aka Mini/Sona-didi – an inborn singer, disabled daughter of Anandi and Halua, Phuljhuri's eldest cousin sister and bodyguard, Debmalya's wife and student. (2021 – 2022)
 Debottam Majumdar as Debmalya Basu – a social worker and tutor of the disabled, Mrinmayee's husband and teacher (2022)
 Mainak Banerjee as Ganataan Ganguly aka Taan – Owner of the car, Phuljhuri's cousin brother, Chorui's elder brother, Chandreyi and Gablu's son, Kamalini's husband (2021 – 2022)
 Raja Goswami as Rishi Talukdar – Sreerupa's son, Chorui's husband, Gablu and Chandreyi's son in-law (2022)
 Ipsita Mukherjee as Kamalini Ganguly – Taan's wife, Chandreyi and Gablu's daughter in-law (2021 – 2022)
 Rishav Chakraborty as Kabul Chatterjee – Ratulmoni's daughter's son (2021 – 2022)

Chatterjee Family/Lalon's Family
 Phalguni Chatterjee as Raghubir Chatterjee – a priest, Dolly and Lalon's father, Supriya's husband, Chorui's former well wisher, Swadesh and Phuljhuri's father in-law. (2021 – 2022)
 Rita Dutta Chakraborty as Supriya Chatterjee – Dolly and Lalon's mother, Raghubir's wife, Swadesh and Phuljhuri's mother in-law (2021 – 2022)
 Sahana Sen as Dolly – Raghubir and Supriya's daughter, Lalon's elder sister, Swadesh's wife. She created a misunderstanding between Lalon and Phuljhuri. (2021 – 2022) (Former Antagonist)

Das Family/Phuljhuri's foster family
 Shaktipada Dey as Subal Das – Phuljhuri's foster father and rival, Priya and Pooja's father, Bittu's father in-law, Lalon's foster father in-law and Arati's husband (2021 – 2022) (Antagonist)
 Rajasree Bhowmick as Arati Das – Phuljhuri's foster mother, Priya and Pooja's mother, Bittu's mother in-law, Lalon's foster mother in-law and Subal's wife (2021 – 2022)
 Deerghoi Paul as Priya Dutta (née Das) – Subal and Arati's elder daughter, Bittu's wife, Pooja's elder sister, Lalon's foster younger sister in-law and Phuljhuri's foster younger sister. (2021 – 2022)
 Asmee Ghosh as Pooja Das – Subal and Arati's younger daughter, Priya's younger sister, Lalon's foster youngest sister in-law and Phuljhuri's foster youngest sister (2021 – 2022)

Others
 Tathagata Mukherjee as Ankur Chatterjee – a NRI businessman who made Lalon and Phuljhuri tie the knot and their well-wisher (2022)
 Ayeashrya Chatterjee as Munni – A nurse from Delhi and selfish girl, Lalon's ex girlfriend, childhood friend and former long-time lover. She continued her course in Delhi and returned Kolkata to marry Lalon. But later because of her selfishness, and seeing that Lalon having a relationship with Phuljhuri and Chorui, she rejected Lalon. (2021)
 Satyam Majumder as Manik Das – a widower and father of three, Phuljhuri's stalker and blackmailer who tried to trap or kidnap her falsely and forcibly marry her (2021 – 2022) (Antagonist)
 Amritendu Kar as Lalon's friend (2021)
 Avijit Das as Bittu Dutta – Priya's husband, Subal and Arati's elder son in-law, Phuljhuri's foster brother in-law (2021 – 2022)
 Debalina Banerjee as Phuljhuri's friend (2021)
 Manjusree Ganguly as Kamalini's mother, Taan's mother-in-law (2021)
 Rahul Chakraborty as Kamalini's father, Taan's father-in-law (2021)
 Babul Supriyo as the presenter or host of the reality show (2022)
 Kumar Sanu as the judge of the reality show (2022)
 Debojyoti Mishra as the judge of the reality show (2022)
 Sujit Sen as Chorui's dance teacher (2022)
 Sarmistha as Sreerupa Talukdar – Chandreyi's friend, Rishi's mother and Chorui's mother in-law (2022) (Antagonist)
 Deepjoy Bhattacharjee as Soumo – Chorui's friend who helped her to attack Phuljhuri by poisoning Mrinmayee and intoxifying Mrinmayee and Phuljhuri one night on Phuljhuri's function (2021 – 2022) (Antagonist)
 Ambarish Bhattacharya as Dr. Rohit – Aditi's husband and Titir's father (2022)
 Samata Das as Aditi – Rohit's wife and Titir's mother (2022)
 Sampurna Mondal as Titir – Rohit and Aditi's daughter, Lalon's rescuer turned lover. (2022)

Reception

Production

Release 
The first promo was released on 12 May 2021. The show was telecasted late because when the promo was released, the serials were shooted from the homes of the cast of other ongoing serials at that time. The on-air date was officially announced by Star Jalsha on 9 July 2021. 

The show released on 19 July 2021.

EndThe last shoot was held at 30th November 2022. The last episode was telecasted on 11th December 2022.

Crossover episodes 
Dhulokona had a crossover with Khorkuto on 9 May 2022 on account of Rabindranath Tagore's 161th birth anniversary.

References

External links 
 
 Dhulokona at Disney+ Hotstar

2021 Indian television series debuts
Bengali-language television programming in India
Star Jalsha original programming